Broekie van Broekhuizen (17 June 1872 –  4 August 1953) was a South African international rugby union player who played as a forward.

He made 1 appearance for South Africa against the British Lions in 1896.

References

South African rugby union players
South Africa international rugby union players
1872 births
1953 deaths
Rugby union forwards
Western Province (rugby union) players